The 2010 United States Senate election in Iowa was held on November 2, 2010, alongside other elections to the United States Senate in other states as well as elections to the United States House of Representatives and various state and local elections in Iowa. The party primary elections were held on June 8, 2010. Incumbent Republican U.S. Senator Chuck Grassley won reelection to a sixth term.

Republican primary

Candidates 

 Chuck Grassley, incumbent U.S. Senator

Results

Democratic primary

Candidates 
 Roxanne Conlin, former United States Attorney for the Southern District of Iowa
 Bob Krause, former Iowa State Representative and nominee for Treasurer in 1978
 Tom Fiegen, former Iowa State Senator

Campaign 
Three Democrats sought the Democratic nomination. Former State Representative and Iowa Department of Transportation official Bob Krause drew attention for implying that Grassley had been in office too long, remarking to supporters in Des Moines: "As a good farmer, Sen. Grassley must recognize that 51 years, or 58 years at the end of his term, is a long time to go without rotating crops." Both Krause and former State Senator Tom Fiegen cited Grassley's support of deregulating the financial services industry as reasons for running. Krause said, "Please remember that Farmer Grassley was one that opened the barn door and let the cow out at AIG," while Fiegen, a bankruptcy lawyer, made reducing unemployment and tightening regulation of the financial services industry the cornerstones of his campaign.

Former Iowa Democratic Party Chairman Michael Kiernan said that he had recruited trial lawyer Roxanne Conlin to challenge Grassley. Kiernan's virtual endorsement of Conlin prior to her announcement drew the ire of party members, as it is counter to party rules when there is more than one candidate from the party competing in a primary race. Conlin had been criticized for being unwilling to debate her primary opponents, and for being unfamiliar with and unsupportive of her own party's platform.

On health care, Fiegen and Krause supported a public option, while Conlin didn't state a position, which she had been criticized for. Krause and Feigen claimed she supported supply-side economics. She also displayed an unfamiliarity with the Iowa Democratic Party's platform, repeatedly claiming there was no platform for her to support until after the June 12, 2010 convention.

Results

General election

Candidates 
 Roxanne Conlin (D), former U.S. Attorney
 Chuck Grassley (R), incumbent U.S. Senator
 John Heiderscheit (L), attorney

Campaign 
Incumbent Chuck Grassley started the campaign moderately popular, but his approval ratings dropped somewhat during the campaign. However, the seat continued to be considered to be "Safe Republican" by many sources, with CQ Politics noting that Grassley is "one of Iowa's most durable politicians."

Conlin described herself as a "prairie progressive." She supported the recent landmark case of Varnum v. Brien, which legalized gay marriage in the state. She also supported repeal of "don't ask, don't tell."

Before the election, former political advisor John Maxwell claimed that Grassley would have his toughest race since his first U.S. Senate election in 1980, where he defeated incumbent John Culver with 53% of the vote. Grassley won all of his four re-election bids with nearly 70% of the vote against unknown opponents.  Grassley won the election with 64.35% of the vote, which, in fact was his closest election since 1980.

Debates 
Grassley and Conlin only agreed to one debate. It was on October 26 on Des Moines radio station WHO and Iowa Public Television.

Predictions

Polling

Fundraising

Results

References

External links 
 Iowa Secretary of State - Voter/Elections 
 U.S. Congress candidates for Iowa at Project Vote Smart
 Iowa U.S. Senate from OurCampaigns.com
 Campaign contributions from Open Secrets
 Iowa Polls graph of multiple polls from Pollster.com
 Election 2010: Iowa Senate from Rasmussen Reports
 2010 Iowa Senate Race from Real Clear Politics
 2010 Iowa Senate Race from CQ Politics
 Race profile from The New York Times
Official candidate websites (Archived)
 Chuck Grassley for U.S. Senate incumbent, Republican nominee
 Roxanne Conlin for U.S. Senate Democratic nominee
 Tom Fiegen for U.S. Senate Democrat

2010 Iowa elections
Iowa
2010